Mount Church is a  mountain in the Alaska Range, in Denali National Park and Preserve, overlooking Ruth Glacier.
The mountain was named by famed explorer Dr. Frederick Cook who claimed the first ascent of Mount McKinley in 1906, but was later disproved.

Climate

Based on the Köppen climate classification, Mount Church is located in a subarctic climate zone with long, cold, snowy winters, and cool summers. Temperatures can drop below −20 °C with wind chill factors below −30 °C. The months May through June offer the most favorable weather for climbing or viewing.

See also
Mountain peaks of Alaska

References

External links
 Weather forecast: Mount Church

Alaska Range
Mountains of Matanuska-Susitna Borough, Alaska
Mountains of Denali National Park and Preserve
Mountains of Alaska